Fearless Fagan is a 1952 comedy film directed by Stanley Donen and stars Janet Leigh and Carleton Carpenter. It is about a clown who is drafted into the military and tries to sneak his pet lion into the service. The film was inspired by the 12 Feb 1951 Life Magazine story Fearless Fagan Finds a Home where Private Floyd D. Humeston  requested an emergency 14-day furlough from Ft. Ord, California to take care of his pet lion. Fagan played himself with the army assigning Pvt Humeston to act as a technical adviser on the film.

Plot
Floyd Hilstown is working in a circus as a clown with a comical lion act when he finds out he's a draft dodger. He is given a chance to enlist, instead of going to jail, but he doesn't want to leave his best friend. The friend is one Fearless Fagan, a lion which Floyd has raised since he was four days old. The circus owner Owen Gillman suggests he buy the lion, after which Fagan would be worked as an ordinary lion by the circus lion tamer Emil Tacuchnitz, which doesn't sit well with Floyd.
 
Floyd joins the army and hides Fagan somewhere on the base. All goes well until Abbey Ames, who is on the base to entertain the troops, stumbles on Floyd and Fagan playing in the woods. Frightened, she gives her word to keep Fagan's presence a secret, but soon appears in the woods with Colonel Horne and troops in search of the lion.

When Fagan is found Sgt. Kellwin, Captain Daniels  and Colonel Horne try to help Floyd find the lion a home. After an exhaustive search a home is found with the Ardley's. By this time Floyd has professed his love to Abbey and she is starting to have feelings for him even though she believes him to be a bit touched.

Fagan escapes his cage and creates some humorous havoc along his way back to Floyd. After he is recaptured the Army gives Floyd the choice of selling Fagan to his old circus troop or euthanasia. When Emil comes to pick up Fagan he cracks the whip and is promptly attacked. The lion is wounded by a soldier and Floyd knows a wounded lion will kill so he takes a pistol and knows what he must do. Once he finds the lion he can't pull the trigger and is himself attacked but quickly calms Fagan down.

Floyd wakes up in the hospital to find Sgt. Kellwin, who tells him he's to receive a medal and a ten-day pass. He also tells Floyd that Fagan is alive and Abbey has taken him to Hollywood. Floyd arrives at Abbey's home and to his horror discovers a lion skin rug. Abbey then appears and leads Floyd to the outdoor pool where they find Fagan jumping from the diving board and swimming to safety.

Cast
 Janet Leigh as Abbey Ames
 Carleton Carpenter as Pvt. Floyd Hilstown of Company J
 Keenan Wynn as Sgt. Kellwin of Company J
 Richard Anderson as Capt. Daniels of Company J
 Ellen Corby as Mrs. Ardley
 Fearless Fagan as himself
 Barbara Ruick as Nurse
 John Call as Mr. Ardley
 Robert Burton as Owen Gillman
 Wilton Graft as Col. Horne
 Parley Baer as Emil Tacuchnitz
 Jonathan Cott Cpl. Geft of Company J

Reception
According to MGM records the film earned $722,000 in the US and Canada and $228,000 overseas resulting in a loss of $324,000. Harrison's Reports found the movie "...a highly amusing comedy, the kind that will provoke uproarious laughter."

References

External links
 
 
 
 
 "Fearless Fagan: Portrait of the Lion as a Young Actor", Life Magazine.

1952 films
1952 comedy films
Metro-Goldwyn-Mayer films
American comedy films
Films with screenplays by Charles Lederer
Military humor in film
Films about lions
American black-and-white films
1950s English-language films
Films directed by Stanley Donen
1950s American films